The LGBT community in Cardiff is the largest in Wales. It has also been ranked as the 8th most accepting city in the world for the LGBT community.

Cardiff has a vibrant gay scene, with all the main venues being within walking distance of each other. Long established venues like The Golden Cross, Mary's, Pulse and Eagle are the backbone of the community. Today, they are joined by newer businesses such as The Queer Emporium (containing Paned o Gê bookshop) and Glory Stores.

The Queer Emporium also hosts the annual Queer Fringe Festival in Cardiff, their first festival in 2022. The Iris Prize is also an annual LGBTQ+ short film and prize awarding festival.

Cardiff has multiple LGBTQ+ choirs including the South Wales Gay Men's Chorus, Cardiff Trans Singers and Songbirds.

There are also a number of social and mutual support groups in the city, listed on Umbrella Cymru.

St Fagans, the  Museum of Cardiff and Glamorgan Archives collect artifacts relating to Cardiff LGBTQ+ life.

Demographics
The 2021 Census showed that 5.33% of Cardiff's population identifies as LGBTQ+.

Glitter Cymru are a Cardiff based but Wales wide community group for ethnic minority LGBTQ+ people.

History
Homosexuality was partially decriminalised in 1967. in part instigated by Cardiff born MP Leo Abse (whose MP seat was in Pontypool).

Prior to the law change there is some evidence of LGBTQ+ culture in Cardiff around criminal records for cross dressing, gross indecency and buggary, though criminalisations were higher than rural areas they were minor compared to other UK cities.

Cardiff's The Golden Cross opened in 1863, it has been recognised as a gay bar since at least the 1970s when a wider commercial gay scene was first prominent in the city.

A Cardiff-Newport branch of Campaign for Homosexual Equality (CHE) was formed in 1972, most of its 50+ members living in Cardiff, first meeting at the Blue Anchor pub on St Mary's Street (now Le Monde restaurant) but later moving to Chapter Arts Centre in Canton. More popular with men, a separatist women's group later formed. A Cardiff faction of the Gay Liberation Front also formed in this era also meeting at the Blue Anchor. Ken Follett wrote about the GLF in the South Wales Echo in 1971. The GLF later merged into the CHE group.

Cardiff FRIEND, one of many the city based outposts of London FRIEND also ran from 1973 taking helpline phone calls from an office in St Mary's Street and later the Rights Information Bureau on Charles Street.

The Rights Information Bureau also held offices for the Gay Liberation Front group and the Nationwide Transvestite Group (an early Trans organisation) from 1971.

In the 1980s there were a number of LGBT+ venues in Cardiff including the Tunnel Club (now Metros), Dubrovnik Restaurant and SIRS. The city's oldest gay venue Kings Cross ceased to be an LGBT+ venue in 2013 when it became a gastropub called The Corner House.

The 1980s also saw Cardiff's first dedicated gay street theatre groups, LGBTQ+ community centres and youth clubs. As well as cruising areas being established, most popular being Bute Park, public toilets in Cathays Park and Cardiff Central Station.

Inspired by London's Gay Switchboard, Zoe Balfour started Cardiff Lesbian Line in October 1981, which ran until at least the 1990s. 

1988 saw Cardiff hold a Wales Against Section 28 protest, alongside other city demonstrations across the UK.

By the end of the century parallel roads Charles Street and Churchill Way had become heart of LGBTQ+ Cardiff, including Minskys, a popular cabaret and drag bar which eventually closed 2020.

The early 2000s saw the popular LGBTQ+ club night Hell's Bent in Cardiff, the short lived WOW bar on Churchill Way and gay representation on Russell T. Davies' era of writing Doctor Who and it's spin off Torchwood series, both set in Cardiff.

In 2007 the Iris Prize was formed in Cardiff which celebrates LGBTQ+ short films. It has an annual festival screening films open to the public.

Pride in Cardiff 

The first iteration of Pride held in Cardiff was in 1985, which was a parade on Queen Street in the city centre organised by Cardiff University students (principaly their GaySoc/Cardiff Lesbian and Gay Stidents group).  Organiser Francis Brown remembers attendance being less than 30 but Noreena Shopland's Forbidden Lives cites over 100 attendees.

The march continued annually in the following years 1986 and 1987, finishing at the Kings Cross pub.

Later the first Cardiff Mardi Gras was held in September 1999, and has happened annually since, usually in September, it has since changed its name to the national festival Pride Cymru.

Notable residents
Those identifying as LGBTQ+ past and present:
Ivor Novello
Stephen Doughty
Felicity Evans
Lisa Power
Gareth Thomas (rugby)
Laura McAllister
Jess Fishlock
Nathan Wyburn
La-Chun Lindsay
David Llewellyn
Scott McGlynn
Norena Shopland

See also
 LGBT culture

External links 

 Visit Wales guide to LGBT Cardiff
 Lost LGBT Cardiff Map

References

LGBT culture in the United Kingdom
Culture in Cardiff
LGBT history in the United Kingdom
LGBT in Wales